Hodgson is a community in the Rural Municipality of Fisher in the Canadian province of Manitoba.

It is located on Highway 325 in the Interlake Region of the province.

Climate

References

Unincorporated communities in Interlake Region, Manitoba